The 2012 Women's Premier Soccer League season is the 16th season of the WPSL.  2012 saw the formation of two new leagues within the WPSL structure: the WPSL Elite League and a U-20 League.

Changes from 2011

Name changes

New franchises 

Note: A place for a St. Louis team was created on the WPSL website in early 2012 and remains there, but the team was not part of the 2012 season.

Folding/moving 
To WPSL Elite League:
ASA Chesapeake Charge
Chicago Red Stars
FC Indiana
New England Mutiny
New York Fury
Folded:
Chelsea Metro
Orange County Waves

Standings
Blue indicates division titleYellow indicates qualified for playoffs

Big Sky Conference

North Division

South Division

Northeast Atlantic Conference

North Division

Mid Division

South Division

Midwest Conference

Northwest Conference

Pacific Conference

North Division

South Division

Southeast Conference

Sunshine Conference

Playoffs

Northeast Atlantic Conference

Big Sky/Pacific/Northwest Conference

Big Sky-South playoff
Winner goes to national semi-finals

Inter-divisional playoff
Winner goes to national semi-finals

Sunshine Conference

The Sunshine division championship was cancelled due to a high number of players returning to college.

WPSL Championship

Composite top 16 bracket

References

External links
 WPSL Standings

Women's Premier Soccer League seasons
2